Gustav Franz Wagner (18 July 1911 – 3 October 1980) was an Austrian member of the SS with the rank of Staff sergeant (Oberscharführer). Wagner was a deputy commander of Sobibor extermination camp in German-occupied Poland, where  200,000-250,000 Jews were murdered in the camp's gas chambers during Operation Reinhard.  Due to his brutality, he was known as "The Beast" and "Wolf".

Biography
Wagner was born in Vienna, Austria and joined the Nazi Party in 1931 as member number 443,217.  After being arrested for proscribed National Socialist agitation, he fled to Germany, where he joined the SA and later the Schutzstaffel in the late 1930s.

In May 1940, Wagner was part of the Aktion T4 euthanasia program at Hartheim killing centre with administrative functions.  Due to his experience in T4, Wagner was assigned to help establish the Sobibor extermination camp in March 1942. Once the gassing installations were completed, Wagner became deputy commandant of the camp under Commandant Franz Stangl.  His official title was quartermaster-sergeant of the camp.

Wagner was in charge of selecting which prisoners from the newly arrived transports would be used as slave laborers in and outside the camp, and which would be murdered in the gas chambers. When Wagner was on vacation or attending to duties elsewhere, Karl Frenzel assumed his role within the camp.

More than any other officer at Sobibor, Wagner was responsible for the daily interactions with prisoners. Survivors of the camp described him as a cold-blooded sadist.  Wagner was known to beat and thrash camp inmates on a regular basis, and to kill Jews without reason or restraint. Inmate Moshe Bahir described him:

Erich Bauer later remarked:

Inmate Eda Lichtman wrote that on the Jewish fast day of Yom Kippur, Wagner appeared at roll call, selected some prisoners, gave them bread and forced them to eat it.  As the prisoners ate the bread, Wagner laughed loudly, enjoying his joke because he knew that these Jews were pious.

One of the Sobibor prisoners improvised a song which ironically described camp life (original text with English translation):

Wagner enjoyed this song and he forced the prisoners to sing it frequently.

After two Jews escaped from Sobibor in the spring of 1943, Wagner was put in charge of a squad of soldiers from the Wehrmacht, who laid minefields around the camp so as to prevent further escapes. However, these efforts did not prevent another escape, which took form in the Sobibor revolt. Wagner was not present at the camp on the day of the Sobibor revolt on 14 October 1943, having taken a holiday with his then wife Karin to celebrate the birth of a daughter, Marion. The inmates knew of Wagner's absence and believed that it would improve their chances of success.  Wagner was considered the strictest in terms of prisoner supervision at the camp. After the successful revolt, Wagner was ordered to aid in closing the camp. He helped to dismantle and remove evidence of the camp by ruthlessly commanding the Jewish prisoners who performed this task.  For instance, after the Arbeitsjuden "worker Jews" had been transported from Treblinka and had successfully torn down the Sobibor barracks, Wagner killed them.

Heinrich Himmler considered Wagner to be "one of the most deserving men of Operation Reinhard".

After Sobibor, Wagner was transferred to Italy, where he participated in the deportation of Jews.

After World War II
Wagner was sentenced to death in absentia, but escaped with Franz Stangl to Brazil. Clergy at the Collegio Teutonico di Santa Maria dell'Anima in Rome assisted Wagner in his flight from justice to Syria.  Wagner was admitted as a permanent resident on 12 April 1950 and on  a Brazilian passport was issued in the name of "Günther Mendel", his new identity. He worked as a house-helper for a wealthy Brazilian family and then as a maker of concrete fence posts. He married a local woman who was a widow and raised her children. 
Wagner was arrested on 30 May 1978 after an investigation by Simon Wiesenthal. When Stangl had been put on trial in Germany, he testified that Wagner was living in Brazil, but the Brazilian police failed to locate him. When a journalist showed Wiesenthal a photograph of a group of German-Brazilians celebrating Hitler's eighty-ninth birthday, Wiesenthal falsely identified one of the men as Wagner, thinking that he could spook Wagner into fleeing and inadvertently revealing himself. However, Wagner instead surrendered himself to the Brazilian authorities, who then refused extradition requests from Israel, Austria, Yugoslavia, West Germany, and Poland.

Wagner, in a 1979 BBC interview, showed no remorse for his activities in running the camp, remarking:

In October 1980, Wagner was found dead with a knife in his chest in Atibaia. Wagner's attorney reported his death as a suicide though Szlomo Szmajzner implied to Jules Schelvis and Richard Rashke that there may have been more to the story. Wagner's date of death was determined to be 3 October 1980.

References

1911 births
1980 suicides
Military personnel from Vienna
Aktion T4 personnel
Austrian Nazis convicted of war crimes
Nazis in South America
Nazis who committed suicide
Nazis sentenced to death in absentia
Sturmabteilung personnel
Sobibor extermination camp personnel
SS non-commissioned officers
Naturalized citizens of Brazil
Suicides by sharp instrument in Brazil
Holocaust perpetrators in Poland
Austrian Nazis
1980 deaths